Lung cancer, also known as lung carcinoma, is a malignant tumor that begins in the lung. Lung cancers are caused by genetic damage to the DNA of cells in the airways, often exacerbated by cigarette smoking, or inhaling damaging chemicals. Damaged airway cells sometimes gain the ability to proliferate unchecked, causing the growth of a tumor. Without treatment, lung tumors can spread throughout the lung, damaging lung function. Eventually lung tumors metastasize, spreading to distant parts of the body, and causing varying disease. Lung cancers are classified based on the cells they originate from. Around 15% are small-cell lung cancers, while the remaining 85% (the non-small-cell lung cancers) are adenocarcinomas, squamous-cell carcinomas, and large-cell carcinomas.

Early lung cancer often has no noticeable symptoms, and can only be detected by lung cancer screening programs. As the cancer progresses, most people experience symptoms of general respiratory problems: coughing, shortness of breath, and/or chest pain. These can be accompanied by a wide variety of symptoms depending on the location and size of the tumor. Many develop symptoms due to metastases – most commonly to the brain, bones, liver, and adrenal glands. Some tumors cause the release of various hormones that impact body-wide functions, causing an array of symptoms collectively called paraneoplastic syndromes. Those suspected of having lung cancer typically undergo various imaging tests to determine the location and extent of any tumors. Definitive diagnosis of lung cancer requires a biopsy of the suspected tumor be examined by a histologist under a microscope. After diagnosis, lung cancer is staged based on how far it has spread. Cancers caught at an earlier stage tend to have better prognoses.

Treatment for early stage lung cancers tends to include surgery to remove the tumor, sometimes followed by radiation therapy and chemotherapy to kill remaining cancer cells. Later stage cancers are treated with radiation therapy and chemotherapy alongside targeted molecular therapies and immune checkpoint inhibitors. Even with treatment, lung cancer is often deadly, with around 19% of people surviving five years from their lung cancer diagnosis. Survival is higher in those diagnosed at an earlier stage, diagnosed at a younger age, and in women compared to men.

The vast majority (85%) of cases of lung cancer are due to long-term tobacco smoking. About 10–15% of cases occur in people who have never smoked. These cases are often caused by a combination of genetic factors and exposure to radon gas, asbestos, second-hand smoke, or other forms of air pollution. Lung cancer may be seen on chest radiographs and computed tomography (CT) scans. The diagnosis is confirmed by biopsy, which is usually performed by bronchoscopy or CT-guidance.

The major method of prevention is the avoidance of risk factors, including smoking and air pollution. Treatment and long-term outcomes depend on the type of cancer, the stage (degree of spread), and the person's overall health. Most cases are not curable. Common treatments include surgery, chemotherapy, and radiotherapy. NSCLC is sometimes treated with surgery, whereas SCLC usually responds better to chemotherapy and radiotherapy.

Worldwide in 2020, lung cancer occurred in 2.2 million people and resulted in 1.8 million deaths. It is the most common cause of cancer-related death in both men and women. The average age at diagnosis is 71 years. In most countries the five-year survival rate is around 10 to 20%, although outcomes typically are worse in the developing world.

Signs and symptoms
Early lung cancer often has no symptoms. When symptoms do arise they are often nonspecific respiratory problems – coughing, shortness of breath, and/or chest pain – that can differ from person to person. Those who experience coughing tend to report either a new cough, or an increase in the frequency or strength of a pre-existing cough. Around one in four cough up blood, ranging from small streaks in the sputum to large amounts. Around half of those diagnosed with lung cancer experience shortness of breath, while 25–50% experience a dull, persistent chest pain that remains in the same location over time. In addition to respiratory symptoms, some experience systemic symptoms including loss of appetite, weight loss, general weakness, fever, and night sweats.

Some less common symptoms suggest tumors in particular locations. Tumors in the thorax can cause breathing problems by obstructing the trachea or disrupting the nerve to the diaphragm; difficulty swallowing by compressing the esophagus; hoarseness by disrupting the nerves of the larynx; and Horner's syndrome by disrupting the sympathetic nervous system. Horner's syndrome is also common in tumors at the top of the lung, known as Pancoast tumors, which also cause shoulder pain that radiates down the little-finger side of the arm as well as destruction of the topmost ribs. Swollen lymph nodes above the collarbone can indicate a tumor that has spread within the chest. Tumors obstructing bloodflow to the heart can cause superior vena cava syndrome (swelling of the upper body and shortness of breath), while tumors infiltrating the area around the heart can cause fluid buildup around the heart, arrythmia (irregular heartbeat), and heart failure.

About one in three people diagnosed with lung cancer have symptoms caused by metastases in sites distant from the lung. Lung cancer can metastasize anywhere in the body, with different symptoms depending on the location. Brain metastases can cause headache, nausea, vomiting, seizures, and neurological deficits. Bone metastases can cause pain, bone fractures, and compression of the spinal cord. Metastasis into the bone marrow can deplete blood cells and cause leukoerythroblastosis (immature immune cells in the blood). Liver metastases can cause liver enlargement, pain in the right upper quadrant of the abdomen, fever, and weight loss.

Lung tumors also often cause the release of body-altering hormones, which themselves cause unusual symptoms, called paraneoplastic syndromes. Inappropriate hormone release can cause dramatic shifts in concentrations of blood minerals. Most common is hypercalcemia (high blood calcium) caused by over-production of parathyroid hormone-related protein or parathyroid hormone. Hypercalcemia can manifest as nausea, vomiting, abdominal pain, constipation, increased thirst, frequent urination, and altered mental status. Those with lung cancer also commonly experience hypokalemia (low potassium) due to inappropriate secretion of adrenocorticotropic hormone, as well as hyponatremia (low sodium) due to overproduction of antidiuretic hormone or atrial natriuretic peptide. About one of three people with lung cancer develop nail clubbing, while up to one in ten experience hypertrophic pulmonary osteoarthropathy (nail clubbing, joint soreness, and skin thickening). A variety of autoimmune disorders can arise as paraneoplastic syndromes in those with lung cancer, including Lambert–Eaton myasthenic syndrome (which causes muscle weakness), sensory neuropathies, muscle inflammation, brain swelling, and autoimmune deterioration of cerebellum, limbic system, or brainstem. Up to one in twelve people with lung cancer have paraneoplastic blood clotting, including migratory venous thrombophlebitis, clots in the heart, and disseminated intravascular coagulation (clots throughout the body). Paraneoplastic syndromes involving the skin and kidneys are rare, each occurring in up to 1% of those with lung cancer.

Diagnosis

A person suspected of having lung cancer will have imaging tests done to evaluate the presence, extent, and location of tumors. First, many primary care providers perform a chest X-ray to look for a mass inside the lung. The x-ray may reveal an obvious mass, the widening of the mediastinum (suggestive of spread to lymph nodes there), atelectasis (lung collapse), consolidation (pneumonia), or pleural effusion; however, some lung tumors are not visible by X-ray. Next, many undergo computed tomography (CT) scanning, which can reveal the sizes and locations of tumors.

A definitive diagnosis of lung cancer requires a biopsy of the suspected tissue be histologically examined for cancer cells. Given the location of lung cancer tumors, biopsies can often be obtained by minimally invasive techniques: a fiberoptic bronchoscope that can retrieve tissue (sometimes guided by endobronchial ultrasound), fine needle aspiration, or other imaging-guided biopsy through the skin. Those who cannot undergo a typical biopsy procedure may instead have a liquid biopsy taken (that is, a sample of some body fluid) which may contain circulating tumor DNA that can be used for molecular testing.

Imaging is also used to assess the extent of cancer spread. Positron emission tomography (PET) scanning or combined PET-CT scanning is often used to locate metastases in the body. Since PET scanning is less sensitive in the brain, the National Comprehensive Cancer Network recommends magnetic resonance imaging (MRI) – or CT where MRI is unavailable – to scan the brain for metastases in those with NSCLC and large tumors, or tumors that have spread to the nearby lymph nodes. When imaging suggests the tumor has spread, the suspected metastasis is often biopsied to confirm that it is cancerous. Lung cancers most commonly metastasize to the brain, bones, liver, and adrenal glands.

Lung cancer can often appear as a solitary pulmonary nodule on a chest radiograph or CT scan. In lung cancer screening studies as many as 30% of those screened appear to have a lung nodule, the majority of which turn out to be benign. Besides lung cancer many other diseases can also give this appearance, including hamartomas, and infectious granulomas caused by tuberculosis, histoplasmosis, or coccidioidomycosis.

Classification

At diagnosis, lung cancers are classified based on the type of cells the tumor is derived from; tumors derived from different cells progress and respond to treatment differently. There are two main types of lung cancer, categorized by the size and appearance of the malignant cells seen by a histopathologist under a microscope: small cell lung cancer (SCLC; 15% of lung cancer diagnoses) and non-small-cell lung cancer (NSCLC; 85% of diagnoses). SCLC tumors are often found near the center of the lungs, in the major airways. Their cells appear small with ill-defined boundaries, not much cytoplasm, many mitochondria, and have distinctive nuclei with granular-looking DNA and no visible nucleoli. NSCLCs comprise a group of three cancer types: adenocarcinoma,  squamous-cell carcinoma, and large-cell carcinoma. Nearly 40% of lung cancers are adenocarcinomas, which usually come from peripheral lung tissue. Their cells grow in three-dimensional clumps, resemble glandular cells, and may produce mucin. Squamous-cell carcinoma causes about 30% of lung cancers. They typically occur close to large airways. The tumors consist of sheets of cells, with layers of keratin. A hollow cavity and associated cell death are commonly found at the center of the tumor. Less than 10% of lung cancers are large-cell carcinomas, so named because the cells are large, with excess cytoplasm, large nuclei, and conspicuous nucleoli. Around 10% of lung cancers are rarer types. These include mixes of the above subtypes like adenosquamous carcinoma, and rare subtypes such as carcinoid tumors, bronchial gland carcinomas, and sarcomatoid carcinomas.

Several lung cancer types are subclassified based on the growth characteristics of the cancer cells. Adenocarcinomas are classified as lepidic (growing along the surface of intact alveolar walls), acinar and papillary, or micropapillary and solid pattern. Lepidic adenocarcinomas tend to be least aggressive; micropapillary and solid pattern adenocarcinomas most aggressive.

In addition to examining cell morphology, biopsies are often stained with immunohistochemistry to confirm lung cancer classification. SCLCs bear the markers of neuroendocrine cells, such as chromogranin, synaptophysin, and CD56. CK7 and CK20 are also commonly used to differentiate lung cancers. CK20 is found in several cancers, but typically absent from lung cancer. CK7 is present in many lung cancers, but absent from squamous cell carcinomas.

Staging

Lung cancer staging is an assessment of the degree of spread of the cancer from its original source. It is one of the factors affecting both the prognosis and the treatment of lung cancer.

SCLC is typically staged with a relatively simple system; cancers are scored as either limited stage or extensive stage. Around a third of people are diagnosed at the limited stage, meaning cancer is confined to one side of the chest, within the scope of a single tolerable radiotherapy field. The other two thirds are diagnosed at the "extensive stage", with cancer spread to both sides of the chest, or to other parts of the body.

NSCLC – and sometimes SCLC – is typically staged with the American Joint Committee on Cancer's Tumor, Node, Metastasis (TNM) staging system. The size and extent of the tumor (T), spread to regional lymph nodes (N), and distant metastases (M) are scored individually, and combined to form stage groups.

Relatively small tumors are designated T1, which are subdivided by size: tumors ≤ 1 centimeter (cm) across are T1a; 1–2 cm T1b; 2–3 cm T1c. Tumors up to 5 cm across, or those that have spread to the visceral pleura (tissue covering the lung) or main bronchi, are designated T2. T2a designates 3–4 cm tumors; T2b 4–5 cm tumors. T3 tumors are up to 7 cm across, have multiple nodules in the same lobe of the lung, or invade the chest wall, diaphragm (or the nerve that controls it), or area around the heart. Tumors that are larger than 7 cm, have nodules spread in different lobes of a lung, or invade the mediastinum (center of the chest cavity), heart, largest blood vessels that supply the heart, trachea, esophagus, or spine are designated T4. Lymph node staging depends on the extent of local spread: with the cancer metastasized to no lymph nodes (N0), pulmonary or hilar nodes (along the bronchi) on the same side as the tumor (N1), mediastinal or subcarinal lymph nodes (in the middle of the lungs, N2), or lymph nodes on the opposite side of the lung from the tumor (N3). Metastases are staged as no metastases (M0), nearby metastases (M1a; the space around the lung or the heart, or the opposite lung), a single distant metastasis (M1b), or multiple metastases (M1c).

These T, N, and M scores are combined to designate a stage grouping for the cancer. Cancers limited to smaller tumors are designated stage I. Those with larger tumors or spread to the nearest lymph nodes are stage II. Those with the largest tumors or extensive lymph node spread are stage III. Cancers that have metastasized are stage IV. Each stage is further subdivided based on the combination of T, N, and M scores.

Screening

Screening programs attempt to detect lung tumors in asymptomatic individuals early enough that the tumors can be successfully treated. Regular low-dose CT scans in individuals at high risk of developing lung cancer reduce total lung cancer deaths by as much as 20%. The United States Preventive Services Task Force recommends yearly screening using low-dose CT in people between 55 and 80 who have a smoking history of at least 30 pack-years.

Treatment

Treatment for lung cancer depends on the cancer's specific cell type, how far it has spread, and the person's health. Common treatments for early stage cancers include surgical removal of the tumor, chemotherapy, and radiation therapy. For later stage cancers, chemotherapy and radiation therapy are combined with newer targeted molecular therapies and immune checkpoint inhibitors. All lung cancer treatment regimens are combined with lifestyle changes and palliative care to improve quality of life.

Small-cell lung cancer
Limited-stage SCLC is typically treated with a combination of chemotherapy and radiotherapy. For chemotherapy, the National Comprehensive Cancer Network and American College of Chest Physicians guidelines recommend four to six cycles of a platinum-based chemotherapeutic – cisplatin or carboplatin – combined with either etoposide or irinotecan. This is typically combined with thoracic radiation therapy – 45 Gray (Gy) twice-daily – alongside the first two chemotherapy cycles. First-line therapy causes remission in up to 80% of those who receive it; however most people relapse with chemotherapy-resistant disease. Those who relapse are given second-line chemotherapies. Topotecan and lurbinectedin are approved by the US FDA for this purpose. Irinotecan, paclitaxel, docetaxel, vinorelbine, etoposide, and gemcitabine are also sometimes used, and are similarly efficacious. Prophylactic cranial irradiation can reduce the risk of brain metastases and improve survival in those with limited-stage disease.

Extensive-stage SCLC is treated first with etoposide along with either cisplatin or carboplatin. Radiotherapy is used only to shrink tumors that are causing particularly severe symptoms. Combining standard chemotherapy with an immune checkpoint inhibitor can improve survival for a minority of those affected, extending the average person's lifespan by around 2 months.

Non-small-cell lung cancer
For stage I and stage II NSCLC the first line of treatment is often surgical removal of the affected lobe of the lung. For those not well enough to tolerate full lobe removal, a smaller chunk of lung tissue can be removed by wedge resection or segmentectomy surgery. Those with centrally located tumors and otherwise-healthy respiratory systems may have more extreme surgery to remove an entire lung (pneumonectomy). Experienced thoracic surgeons, and a high-volume surgery clinic improve chances of survival. Those who are unable or unwilling to undergo surgery can instead receive radiation therapy. Stereotactic body radiation therapy is best practice, typically administered several times over 1–2 weeks. Chemotherapy has little effect in those with stage I NSCLC, and may worsen disease outcomes in those with the earliest disease. In those with stage II disease, chemotherapy is usually initiated six to twelve weeks after surgery, with up to four cycles of cisplatin – or carboplatin in those with kidney problems, neuropathy, or hearing impairment – combined with vinorelbine, pemetrexed, gemcitabine, or docetaxel.

Treatment for those with stage III NSCLC depends on the nature of their disease. Those with more limited spread may undergo surgery to have the tumor and affected lymph nodes removed, followed by chemotherapy and potentially radiotherapy. Those with particularly large tumors (T4) and those for whom surgery is impractical are treated with combination chemotherapy and radiotherapy along with the immunotherapy durvalumab. Combined chemotherapy and radiation enhances survival compared to chemotherapy followed by radiation, though the combination therapy comes with harsher side effects.

Those with stage IV disease are treated with combinations of pain medication, radiotherapy, immunotherapy, and chemotherapy. Many cases of advanced disease can be treated with targeted therapies depending on the genetic makeup of the cancerous cells. Up to 30% of tumors have mutations in the EGFR gene that result in an overactive EGFR protein; these can be treated with EGFR inhibitors osimertinib, erlotinib, gefitinib, afatinib, or dacomitinib – with osimertinib known to be superior to erlotinib and gefitinib, and all superior to chemotherapy alone. Up to 7% of those with NSCLC harbor mutations that result in hyperactive ALK protein, which can be treated with ALK inhibitors crizotinib, or its successors alectinib, brigatinib, and ceritinib. Those treated with ALK inhibitors who relapse can then be treated with the third-generation ALK inhibitor lorlatinib. Up to 5% with NSCLC have overactive MET, which can be inhibited with MET inhibitors capmatinib or tepotinib. Targeted therapies are also available for some cancers with rare mutations. Cancers with hyperactive BRAF (around 2% of NSCLC) can be treated by dabrafenib combined with the MEK inhibitor trametinib; those with activated ROS1 (around 1% of NSCLC) can be inhibited by crizotinib, lorlatinib, or entrectinib; overactive NTRK (<1% of NSCLC) by entrectinib or larotrectinib; active RET (around 1% of NSCLC) by selpercatinib.

People whose NSCLC is not targetable by current molecular therapies instead can be treated with combination chemotherapy plus immune checkpoint inhibitors, which prevent cancer cells from inactivating immune T cells. The chemotherapeutic agent of choice depends on the NSCLC subtype: cisplatin plus gemcitabine for squamous cell carcinoma, cisplatin plus pemetrexed for non-squamous cell carcinoma. Immune checkpoint inhibitors are most effective against cancers that express the protein PD-L1, but are sometimes effective in those that do not. Treatment with pembrolizumab, atezolizumab, or combination nivolumab plus ipilimumab are all superior to chemotherapy alone against tumors expressing PD-L1. Those who relapse on the above are treated with second-line chemotherapeutics docetaxel and ramucirumab.

Palliative care
Integrating palliative care (medical care focused on improving symptoms and lessening discomfort) into lung cancer treatment from the time of diagnosis improves the survival time and quality of life of those with lung cancer. Particularly common symptoms of lung cancer are shortness of breath and pain. Supplemental oxygen, improved airflow, re-orienting an effected person in bed, and low-dose morphine can all improve shortness of breath. In around 20 to 30% of those with lung cancer – particularly those with late-stage disease – growth of the tumor can narrow or block the airway, causing cough and diffulty breathing. Obstructing tumors can be surgically removed where possible, though typically those with airway obstruction are not well enough for surgery. In such cases the American College of Chest Physicians recommends opening the airway by inserting a stent, attempting to shrink the tumor with localized radiation (brachytherapy), or physically removing the blocking tissue by bronchoscopy, sometimes aided by thermal or laser ablation. Other causes of lung cancer-associated shortness of breath can be treated directly, such as antibiotics for a lung infection, diuretics for pulmonary edema, benzodiazepines for anxiety, and steroids for airway obstruction.

Up to 92% of those with lung cancer report pain, either from tissue damage at the tumor site(s) or nerve damage. The World Health Organization (WHO) has developed a three-tiered system for managing cancer pain. For those with mild pain (tier one), the WHO recommends acetominophen or a nonsteroidal anti-inflammatory drug. Around a third of people experience moderate (tier two) or severe (tier three) pain, for which the WHO recommends opioid painkillers. Opioids are typically effective at easing nociceptive pain (pain caused by damage to various body tissues). Opioids are occasionally effective at easing neuropathic pain (pain cauesd by nerve damage). Neuropathic agents such as anticonvulsants, tricyclic antidepressants, and serotonin–norepinephrine reuptake inhibitors, are often used to ease neuropathic pain, either alone or in combination with opioids. In many cases, targeted radiotherapy can be used to shrink tumors, reducing pain and other symptoms caused by tumor growth.

Individuals who have advanced disease and are approaching end-of-life can benefit from dedicated end-of-life care to manage symptoms and ease suffering. As in earlier disease, pain and difficulty breathing are common, and can be managed with opioid pain medications, transitioning from oral medication to injected medication if the affected individual loses the ability to swallow. Cough is also common, and can be managed with opioids or cough suppressants. Some experience terminal delirium – confused behavior, unexplained movements, and/or a reversal of the sleep-wake cycle – which can be managed by antipsychotic drugs, low-dose sedatives, and investigating other causes of discomfort such as low blood sugar, constipation, and sepsis. In the last few days of life, many develop terminal secretions – pooled fluid in the airways that can cause a rattling sound while breathing. This is thought not to cause respiratory problmes, but can distress family members and caregivers. Terminal secretions can be reduced by anticholinergic medications. Even those who are non-communicative or have reduced consciousness may be able to experience cancer-related pain, so pain medications are typically continued until the time of death.

Prognosis

Around 19% of people diagnosed with lung cancer survive five years from diagnosis, though prognosis varies dramatically based on the stage of the disease at diagnosis and the type of lung cancer. Prognosis is better for lung cancers diagnosed at an earlier stage; those diagnosed at the earliest TNM stage, IA1 (small tumor, no spread), have a two-year survival of 97% and five-year survival of 92%. Those diagnosed at the most-advanced stage, IVB, have a two-year survival of 10% and a five-year survival of 0%. Five-year survival is higher in women (22%) than men (16%). Women tend to be diagnosed with less-advanced disease, and have better outcomes than men diagnosed at the same stage. 

SCLC is particularly aggressive; 10–15% of people with SCLC survive 5 years after diagnosis. The average person diagnosed with limited-stage SCLC survives 12–20 months from diagnosis; the average person diagnosed with extensive-stage survives around 12 months.  Most people treated for SCLC relapse and eventually develop chemotherapy-resistant cancer. The average person whose SCLC relapses after treatment survives 3–4 months from the time of relapse. Those with limited stage SCLC that goes into complete remission after chemotherapy and radiotherapy have a 50% chance of brain metastases developing within the next two years – a chance reduced by prophylactic cranial irradiation.

The prognosis of patients with NSCLC improved significantly in the last years with the introduction of immunotherapy. 68–92% of those diagnosed with stage I NSCLC survive at least 5 years after diagnosis, as do 53–60% of those diagnosed with stage II NSCLC. Around 40% of those diagnosed with NSCLC have stage IV disease at the time of diagnosis.

Several personal and disease factors are associated with improved outcomes. Those diagnosed at an earlier disease stage tend to have better prognoses, as do those diagnosed at a younger age. Those who smoke or experience weight loss as a symptom tend to have worse outcomes. Large/active metastases (by PET scan) and tumor mutations in KRAS are associated with reduced survival.

Experience
The uncertainty of lung cancer prognosis often causes stress, and makes future planning difficult, for those with lung cancer and their families. Those whose cancer goes into remission often experience fear of their cancer returning or progressing, associated with poor quality of life, negative mood, and functional impairment. This fear is exacerbated by frequent or prolonged surveillance imaging, and other reminders of cancer risks.

Causes

Lung cancer is caused by genetic damage to the DNA of lung cells. These changes are sometimes random, but are typically induced by breathing in toxic substances such as cigarette smoke. Cancer-causing genetic changes affect the cell's normal functions, including cell proliferation, programmed cell death (apoptosis), and DNA repair. As more damage accumulates, the risk for cancer increases. Eventually, cells gain enough genetic changes to grow uncontrollably, forming a tumor, and eventually spreading within and then beyond the lung. Rampant tumor growth and spread causes the symptoms of lung cancer. If unstopped, the spreading tumor will eventually cause the death of affected individuals.

Smoking

Tobacco smoking is by far the major contributor to lung cancer, causing 80% to 90% of cases. Lung cancer risk increases with quantity of cigarettes consumed. Tobacco smoking's carcinogenic effect is due to various chemicals in tobacco smoke that cause DNA mutations, increasing the chance of cells becoming cancerous. The International Agency for Research on Cancer identifies at least 50 chemicals in tobacco smoke as carcinogenic, with the most potent being the tobacco-specific nitrosamines. Exposure to these chemicals causes several kinds of DNA damage: DNA adducts, oxidative stress, and breaks in the DNA strands. Being around tobacco smoke – called passive smoking – can also cause lung cancer. Living with a tobacco smoker increases one's risk of developing lung cancer by 24%. An estimated 17% of lung cancer cases in those who do not smoke are caused by high levels of environmental tobacco smoke.

Vaping may be a risk factor for lung cancer, but less than that of cigarettes, and further research is necessary due to the length of time it can take for lung cancer to develop following an exposure to carcinogens.

The smoking of non-tobacco products is not known to be associated with lung cancer development. Marijuana smoking does not seem to independently cause lung cancer – despite the relatively high levels of tar and known carcinogens in marijuana smoke. The relationship between smoking cocaine and developing lung cancer has not been studied.

Environmental exposures
Exposure to a variety of other toxic chemicals – typically encountered in certain occupations – are associated with an increased risk of lung cancer. In all, occupational exposures to carcinogens cause 9–15% of lung cancers. A prominent example is asbestos, which causes lung cancer either directly or indirectly by inflamming the lung. Exposure to all commercially available forms of asbestos increase cancer risk, and cancer risk increases with time of exposure. Asbestos and cigarette smoking increase risk synergestically – i.e. the risk of someone who smokes and has asbestos exposure dying from lung cancer is much higher than would be expected from adding the two risks together. Similarly, exposure to radon, a naturally occurring breakdown product of the Earth's uranium, is associated with increased lung cancer risk. This is particularly true in underground miners, who have the greatest exposure; but also in indoor air in residential spaces. Like asbestos, cigarette smoking and radon exposure increase risk synergistically. Radon exposure is responsible for between 3% and 14% of lung cancer cases.

Several other chemicals encountered in various occupations are also associated with increased lung cancer risk including arsenic used in wood preservation, pesticide application, and some ore smelting; ionizing radiation encountered during uranium mining; vinyl chloride in papermaking; beryllium in jewelers, ceramics workers, missile technicians, and nuclear reactor workers; chromium in stainless steel production, welding, and hide tanning; nickel in electroplaters, glass workers, metal workers, welders, and those who make batteries, ceramics, and jewelry; and diesel exhaust encountered by miners.

Exposure to air pollution, especially fine particulates, increases the risk of lung cancer.  Fine particulates (PM2.5) and sulfate aerosols, which may be released in traffic exhaust fumes, are associated with a slightly increased risk. For nitrogen dioxide, an incremental increase of 10 parts per billion increases the risk of lung cancer by 14%. Outdoor air pollution is estimated to cause 1–2% of lung cancers. Indoor air pollution from burning wood, charcoal, or crop residue for cooking and heating has also been linked to an increased risk of developing lung cancer. The International Agency for Research on Cancer has classified emission from household burning of coal and biomass as "carcinogenic" and "probably carcinogenic" respectively.

Other diseases
Several other diseases that cause inflammation of the lung increase one's risk of lung cancer. This association is strongest for chronic obstructive pulmonary disorder – the risk is highest in those with the most inflammation, and reduced in those whose inflammation is treated with inhaled corticosteroids. Other inflammatory lung and immune system diseases such as alpha-1 antitrypsin deficiency, interstitial fibrosis, scleroderma, Chlamydia pneumoniae infection, tuberculosis, and HIV infection are also associated with increased risk of developing lung cancer. Epstein-Barr virus is associated with the development of the rare lung cancer lymphoepithelioma-like carcinoma in people from Asia, but not in people from Western nations. A role for several other infectious agents in lung cancer development has been studied but remain inconclusive, namely human papillomaviruses, BK virus, JC virus, human cytomegalovirus, SV40, measles virus, and Torque teno virus.

Genetics
About 8% of lung cancer cases are caused by inherited (genetic) factors. In relatives of people who are diagnosed with lung cancer, the risk is doubled, likely due to a combination of genes. Genome-wide association studies have identified many gene variants associated with lung cancer risk, each of which contributes a small risk increase. Many of these genes participate in pathways known to be involved in carcinogenesis, namely DNA repair, inflammation, the cell division cycle, cellular stress responses, and chromatin remodeling.

Pathogenesis

As with all cancers, lung cancer is triggered by mutations that allow tumor cells to endlessly multiply, stimulate blood vessel growth, avoid apoptosis (programmed cell death), generate pro-growth signalling molecules, ignore anti-growth signalling molecules, and eventually spread into surrounding tissue or metastasize throughout the body. Different tumors can acquire these abilities through different mutations, though generally cancer-contributing mutations activate oncogenes and inactivate tumor suppressors. Some mutations – called "driver mutations" – are particularly common in adenocarcinomas, and contribute disproportionately to tumor development. These typically occur in the receptor tyrosine kinases EGFR, BRAF, MET, KRAS, and PIK3CA. Similarly, some adenocarcinomas are driven by chromosomal rearrangements that result in overexpression of tyrosine kinases ALK, ROS1, NTRK, and RET. A given tumor will typically have just one driver mutation. In contrast, SCLCs rarely have these driver mutations, and instead often have mutations that have inactivated the tumor suppressors p53 and RB. Some LCNECs also present inactivations of p53 and RB (~40%), while others rather present an inactivation of TP53 and STK11 or KEAP1 (~40%). Lung cancer in never smokers might have a different carcinogenic process than in smokers, with either UBA1 mutations or KRAS mutations and a low mutational burden, or EGFR amplifications or mutations, or whole-genome doubling. A cluster of tumor suppressor genes on the short arm of chromosome 3 are often lost early in the development of all lung cancers.

Metastasis of lung cancer requires transition from epithelial to mesenchymal cell type. This may occur through the activation of signaling pathways such as Akt/GSK3Beta, MEK-ERK, Fas, and Par6.

Prevention

Smoking prevention and smoking cessation are effective ways of reducing the risk of lung cancer.

Smoking cessation
Those who smoke can reduce their lung cancer risk by quitting smoking – the risk reduction is greater the longer a person goes without smoking. Self-help programs tend to have little influence on success of smoking cessation, whereas combined counseling and pharmacotherapy improve cessation rates. The U.S. FDA has approved antidepressant therapies and the nicotine replacement varenicline as first-line therapies to aid in smoking cessation. Clonidine and nortriptyline are recommended second-line therapies. The majority of those diagnosed with lung cancer attempt to quit smoking; around half succeed. Even after lung cancer diagnosis, smoking cessation improves treatment outcomes, reducing cancer treatment toxicity and failure rates, and lengthening survival time.

Tobacco control

While in most countries industrial and domestic carcinogens have been identified and banned, tobacco smoking is still widespread. Eliminating tobacco smoking is a primary goal in the prevention of lung cancer, and smoking cessation is an important preventive tool in this process.

Policy interventions to decrease passive smoking in public areas such as restaurants and workplaces have become more common in many Western countries. Bhutan has banned the sale of tobacco since 2004 while India introduced a ban on smoking in public in October 2008. The World Health Organization has called for governments to institute a total ban on tobacco advertising to prevent young people from taking up smoking. They assess that such bans have reduced tobacco consumption by 16% where instituted.

Diet and lifestyle

Several foods and dietary supplements have been associated with lung cancer risk. High consumption of some animal products – red meat (but not other meats or fish), saturated fats, as well as nitrosodimethylamines and nitrites (found in salted and smoked meats) – is associated with an increased risk of developing lung cancer. In contrast, high consumption of fruits and vegetables is associated with a reduced risk of lung cancer, particularly consumption of cruciferous vegetables and raw fruits and vegetables. Based on the beneficial effects of fruits and vegetables, supplementation of several individual vitamins have been studied. Supplementation with vitamin A or beta-carotene had no effect on lung cancer, and instead slightly increased mortality. Dietary supplementation with vitamin E or retinoids similarly had no effect.  The long-term use of supplemental vitamin A, B vitamins, vitamin D or vitamin E does not reduce the risk of lung cancer. Some studies have found vitamins A, B, and E may increase the risk of lung cancer in those who have a history of smoking. Consumption of polyunsaturated fats, tea, alcoholic beverages, and coffee are all associated with reduced risk of developing lung cancer.

In addition to diet, body weight and exercise habits are also associated with lung cancer risk. Being overweight is associated with a lower risk of developing lung cancer, possibly due to the tendency of those who smoke cigarettes to have a lower body weight. Similarly, being underweight is associated with a reduced lung cancer risk. Some studies have shown those who exercise regularly or have better cardiovascular fitness to have a lower risk of developing lung cancer.

Epidemiology

Worldwide, lung cancer is the most diagnosed type of cancer, and the leading cause of cancer death. In 2020, 2.2 million new cases were diagnosed, and 1.8 million people died from lung cancer, representing 18% of all cancer deaths. Lung cancer deaths are expected to rise globally to nearly 3 million annual deaths by 2035, due to high rates of tobacco use and aging populations. Lung cancer is rare in those younger than 40; from there cancer rates increase with age, stabilizing around age 80. The median age of a person diagnosed with lung cancer is 70; the median age of death is 72.

Lung cancer incidence varies dramatically by geography and sex, with the highest rates in Micronesia, Polynesia, Europe, Asia, and North America; and lowest rates in Africa and Central America.Globally, around 8% of men and 6% of women develop lung cancer in their lifetimes. However, the ratio of lung cancer cases in men to women varies dramatically by geography, as high as nearly 12:1 in Belarus, to 1:1 in Brazil, likely due to differences in smoking patterns. In the United States, lung cancer remains the most common cause of cancer deaths, despite a nearly 50% decrease in the death rate from its peak in 1990. Lung cancer is the third-most common cancer in the UK (47,968 people were diagnosed with the disease in 2017), and it is the most common cause of cancer-related death (around 34,600 people died in 2018).

In the US, there are about 350 deaths from lung cancer every day. Rates of lung cancer vary by racial and ethnic group, with the highest rates in African Americans, and the lowest rates in Hispanics, Native Americans and Asian Americans.  Also in the US, military veterans have a 25–50% higher rate of lung cancer primarily due to higher rates of smoking. During World War II and the Korean War, asbestos also played a role, and Agent Orange may have caused some problems during the Vietnam War.

Lung cancer risk is dramatically influenced by environmental exposure, namely cigarette smoking, as well as occupational risks in mining, shipbuilding, petroleum refining, and occupations that involve asbestos exposure. 85–90% of lung cancer cases are in people who have smoked cigarettes, and 15% of smokers develop lung cancer. People who have a long history of smoking have the highest risk of developing lung cancer, with the risk increasing with duration of smoking. The incidence in men rose until the mid-1980s, and has declined since then. In women, the incidence rose until the late 1990s, and has since been stable. Non-smokers' risk of developing lung cancer is also influenced by tobacco smoking; secondhand smoke (i.e. being around tobacco smoke) increases risk of developing lung cancer around 30%, with risk correlated to duration of exposure.

For every 3–4 million cigarettes smoked, one lung cancer death can occur. The influence of "Big Tobacco" plays a significant role in smoking. Young nonsmokers who see tobacco advertisements are more likely to smoke. The role of passive smoking is increasingly being recognized as a risk factor for lung cancer, resulting in policy interventions to decrease the undesired exposure of nonsmokers to others' tobacco smoke.

From the 1960s, the rates of lung adenocarcinoma started to rise in relation to other kinds of lung cancer, partially due to the introduction of filter cigarettes. The use of filters removes larger particles from tobacco smoke, thus reducing deposition in larger airways. However, the smoker has to inhale more deeply to receive the same amount of nicotine, increasing particle deposition in small airways where adenocarcinoma tends to arise. Rates of lung adenocarcinoma continues to rise.

History
Lung cancer was uncommon before the advent of cigarette smoking. Surgeon Alton Ochsner recalled that as a Washington University medical student in 1919, his entire medical school class was summoned to witness an autopsy of a man who had died from lung cancer, and told they may never see such a case again. In Isaac Adler's 1912 Primary Malignant Growths of the Lungs and Bronchi, he called lung cancer "among the rarest forms of disease"; Adler tabulated the 374 cases of lung cancer that had been published to that time, concluding the disease was increasing in incidence. By the 1920s, several theories had been put forward linking the increase in lung cancer to various chemical exposures that had dramatically increased including tobacco smoke, asphalt dust, industrial air pollution, and poisonous gasses from World War I.

Over the following decades, growing scientific evidence linked lung cancer to cigarette consumption. Through the 1940s and early 1950s, several case-control studies showed that those with lung cancer were more likely to have smoked cigarettes compared to those without lung cancer. These were followed by several prospective cohort studies in the 1950s – including the first report of the British Doctors Study in 1954 – all of which showed that those who smoked tobacco were at dramatically increased risk of developing lung cancer.

A 1953 study showing that tar from cigarette smoke could cause tumors in mice attracted attention in the popular press, with features in Life and Time. Facing public concern and falling stock prices, the CEOs of six of the largest American tobacco companies gathered in December 1953. They enlisted the help of public relations firm Hill & Knowlton to craft a multi-pronged strategy aiming to distract from accumulating evidence by funding tobacco-friendly research, declaring the link to lung cancer "controversial", and demanding ever-more research to settle this purported controversy. At the same time, internal research at the major tobacco companies supported the link between tobacco and lung cancer; though these results were kept secret from the public.

As evidence linking tobacco use with lung cancer mounted, various health bodies announced official positions linking the two. In 1962, the United Kingdom's Royal College of Physicians officially concluded that cigarette smoking causes lung cancer, prompting the United States Surgeon General to empanel an advisory committee, which deliberated in secret over nine sessions between November 1962 and December 1963. The committee's report, published in January 1964, firmly concluded that cigarette smoking "far outweighs all other factors" in causing lung cancer. The report received substantial coverage in the popular press, and is widely seen as a turning point for public recognition that tobacco smoking causes lung cancer.

The connection with radon gas was first recognized among miners in the Ore Mountains near Schneeberg, Saxony. Silver has been mined there since 1470, and these mines are rich in uranium, with its accompanying radium and radon gas. Miners developed a disproportionate amount of lung disease, eventually recognized as lung cancer in the 1870s. Despite this discovery, mining continued into the 1950s, due to the USSR's demand for uranium. Radon was confirmed as a cause of lung cancer in the 1960s.

The first successful pneumonectomy for lung cancer was performed in 1933. Palliative radiotherapy has been used since the 1940s. Radical radiotherapy, initially used in the 1950s, was an attempt to use larger radiation doses in patients with relatively early-stage lung cancer, but who were otherwise unfit for surgery. In 1997, CHART was seen as an improvement over conventional radical radiotherapy. With SCLC, initial attempts in the 1960s at surgical resection and radical radiotherapy were unsuccessful. In the 1970s, successful chemotherapy regimens were developed.

Research directions

Clinical trials involving radiotherapy, surgery, EGFR inhibitors, microtubule inhibitors and immunotherapy are ongoing as of 2021.

For lung cancer cases that develop resistance to epidermal growth factor receptor (EGFR) and anaplastic lymphoma kinase (ALK) tyrosine kinase inhibitors, new drugs are in development. EGFR inhibitors include erlotinib, gefitinib, afatinib and icotinib (the last one is only available in China). An alternative signaling pathway, c-Met, can be inhibited by tivantinib and onartuzumab. New ALK inhibitors include crizotinib and ceritinib. If the MAPK/ERK pathway is involved, the BRAF kinase inhibitor dabrafenib and the MAPK/MEK inhibitor trametinib may be beneficial.

Lung cancer stem cells are often resistant to conventional chemotherapy and radiotherapy. This may lead to relapse after treatment. New approaches target protein or glycoprotein markers that are specific to the stem cells. Such markers include CD133, CD90, ALDH1A1, CD44, and ABCG2. Signaling pathways such as Hedgehog, Wnt, and Notch are often implicated in the self-renewal of stem cell lines. Thus, treatments targeting these pathways may help to prevent relapse.

Radiomics combined with artificial intelligence may be used on PET and CT images to help diagnose (or exclude) lung cancer.

References

Cited
Books
 
 
 
 
 
 
 
 

Journal articles

External links 

 
Causes of death
Health effects of tobacco
Types of cancer